Arundel Castle is a restored and remodelled medieval castle in Arundel, West Sussex, England. It was established during the reign of Edward the Confessor and completed by Roger de Montgomery. The castle was damaged in the English Civil War and then restored in the 18th and 19th centuries by Charles Howard, 11th Duke of Norfolk.

Since the 11th century, the castle has been the seat of the Earls of Arundel and the Dukes of Norfolk. It is a Grade I listed building.

History

The original structure was a motte-and-bailey castle. Roger de Montgomery was declared the first Earl of Arundel as the King granted him the property as part of a much larger package of hundreds of manors. Roger, who was a cousin of William the Conqueror, had stayed in Normandy to keep the peace there while William was away in England. He was rewarded for his loyalty with extensive lands in the Welsh Marches and across the country, together with one fifth of Sussex (Arundel Rape). He began work on Arundel Castle in around 1067.

The castle then passed to Adeliza of Louvain (who had previously been married to Henry I) and her husband William d'Aubigny. Empress Matilda stayed in the castle, in 1139. It then passed down the d'Aubigny line until the death of Hugh d'Aubigny, 5th Earl of Arundel in 1243. John Fitzalan then inherited jure matris the castle and honour of Arundel, by which, according to Henry VI's "admission" of 1433, he was later retrospectively held to have become de jure Earl of Arundel.

The FitzAlan male line ceased on the death of Henry Fitzalan, 12th Earl of Arundel, whose daughter and heiress Mary FitzAlan married Thomas Howard, 4th Duke of Norfolk in 1555, to whose descendants the castle and earldom passed.

In 1643, during the First English Civil War, the castle was besieged. The 800 royalists inside surrendered after 18 days. Afterwards in 1653 Parliament ordered the slighting of the castle; however "weather probably destroyed more".

Although the castle remained in the hands of the Howard family over the succeeding centuries, it was not their favourite residence, and the various Dukes of Norfolk invested their time and energy into improving other ducal estates, including Norfolk House in London. Charles Howard, 11th Duke of Norfolk, was known for his restoration work and improvements to the castle beginning in 1787. The folly that still stands on the hill above Swanbourne Lake was commissioned by and built for the Duke by Francis Hiorne at this time.

In 1846, Queen Victoria and her husband, Prince Albert, visited Arundel Castle for three days. Henry Howard, 13th Duke of Norfolk, internally remodelled the castle in time for her visit. The architectural firm responsible for design of the furniture was named Morant. The work included a suite of six rooms, built on the second floor of the south-east range at this time.

After the 1846 Royal visit the 15th Duke began re-structuring the castle again from 1875 to 1905. The work, which was done to the designs of Charles Alban Buckler and undertaken by Rattee and Kett of Cambridge, was completed in the late 19th century. The 16th Duke had planned to give the castle to the National Trust but following his death in 1975 the 17th Duke cancelled the plan. He created an independent charitable trust to guarantee the castle's future, and oversaw restorative works.

The extensive gardens had received significant improvements by early 2020 through the efforts of head gardener Martin Duncan and his crew. A horticulturalist and landscape designer, Duncan has been working at the Castle since 2009; in 2018, he received the Kew Guild Medal. The gardeners and volunteers "have worked wonders with their bold and innovative plantings", according to an April 2020 report by Country Life. Their most recent efforts led to a  wild water garden around the ponds.

Cricket
The cricket field in the castle grounds has, since 1895, seen matches of standards involving teams from local youths to international sides.

Other events
 On 14 October 1651, Captain Morley, who held the Castle for Parliament, while out hunting, almost captured Charles II and Colonel Phillips. Charles II was on the run for his life at the time, fleeing from the Royalist defeat at Worcester. His party managed to just stay clear of Morley's party by dismounting as if to descend the hill more easily, thereby letting Morley's group run past them. (See Gounter, Last Act, p. 12.)
 The visit of Queen Victoria and Prince Albert (1846)
 The opening of the Collector Earl's Garden 14 May 2008 by Charles, then Prince of Wales.
 On Friday 21 May 2021 there was break-in. A set of "irreplaceable" gold rosary beads carried by Mary, Queen of Scots, to her execution in 1587 were among items stolen. Other items taken included coronation cups given by monarchs to the Earl Marshal.

Filming location
Arundel Castle has been used as a filming location for several television and film productions. The BBC filmed extensively at the castle and its grounds in 1988 for the Doctor Who serial Silver Nemesis, where it doubled for Windsor Castle. It also doubled for Windsor Castle in the 1994 film The Madness of King George. Arundel Castle was also a location for the 2009 film The Young Victoria, and the 2017 DC film Wonder Woman.

In literature
In Thomas Malory's epic Morte D'Arthur, Arundel Castle is the castle of Anglides, the mother of Alisander le Orphelin.

See also
 Arundel Museum, close to the castle entrance
 Castles in Great Britain and Ireland
 List of castles in England

References

External links

 Arundel Castle – Official Website
 Arundel Castle
 The Collector Earl's Garden at Arundel Castle

Arun District
+
Castles in West Sussex
Gardens in West Sussex
Houses in West Sussex
Grade I listed buildings in West Sussex
Grade I listed castles
Historic house museums in West Sussex
History of West Sussex
Decorative arts museums in England
Tourist attractions in West Sussex
Castle
Motte-and-bailey castles